The 45th parallel south is a circle of latitude that is 45° south of the Earth's equator.

It is the line that marks the theoretical halfway point between the equator and the South Pole.

Unlike its northern counterpart, almost all (97%) of it passes through open ocean. It crosses the South Atlantic Ocean, the Indian Ocean, Australasia (New Zealand and just south of Tasmania), the Southern Ocean, and Patagonia.

At this latitude, daytime lasts for 15 hours, 37 minutes during the December solstice and 8 hours, 46 minutes during the June solstice.

Around the world
Starting at the Prime Meridian and heading eastwards, the parallel 45° south passes through:

{| class="wikitable plainrowheaders"
! scope="col" width="125" | Co-ordinates
! scope="col" | Country, territory or ocean
! scope="col" | Notes
|-
| style="background:#b0e0e6;" | 
! scope="row" style="background:#b0e0e6;" | Atlantic Ocean
| style="background:#b0e0e6;" |
|-
| style="background:#b0e0e6;" | 
! scope="row" style="background:#b0e0e6;" | Indian Ocean
| style="background:#b0e0e6;" |
|-
| style="background:#b0e0e6;" | 
! scope="row" style="background:#b0e0e6;" | Pacific Ocean
| style="background:#b0e0e6;" | Tasman Sea
|-
| 
! scope="row" | 
| South Island, passing just north of the towns of Oamaru, Naseby, Cromwell and Queenstown, and through the small settlement of Becks
|-
| style="background:#b0e0e6;" | 
! scope="row" style="background:#b0e0e6;" | Pacific Ocean
| style="background:#b0e0e6;" | Passing just south of Guamblin Island, 
|-valign="top"
| 
! scope="row" | 
| Islands in the Chonos Archipelago including James Island and Melchor Island, and Moraleda Channel before reaching the mainland near Macá Volcano.
|-
| 
! scope="row" | 
| Chubut Province
|-
| style="background:#b0e0e6;" | 
! scope="row" style="background:#b0e0e6;" | Atlantic Ocean
| style="background:#b0e0e6;" |
|-
|}

See also
44th parallel south
46th parallel south
45×90 points

References

s45